Esplin is a Scottish surname. Notable people with the surname include:

Mabel Esplin (1874–1921), British stained glass artist
Ron Esplin (born 1944), American Mormon historian

See also
Esplin Islands, a group of two small islands and off-lying rocks lying northeast of Box Reef, off the south end of Adelaide Island
 Asplin

Scottish surnames